Porac, officially the Municipality of Porac, is a 1st class municipality in the province of Pampanga, Philippines. According to the 2020 census, it has a population of 140,751 people.

The Subic–Clark–Tarlac Expressway (SCTEx) traverses this town, the exit of which is located in Barangay Manuali.

It was once among the largest municipalities in the archipelago before it was divided into separate municipalities.

History
Porac was founded on October 31, 1594, upon acceptance by Fray Mateo Peralta in the Friar's Intermediate Chapter (recorded by Fray Gaspar de San Agustin, by saying Porac has its First Minister and Friar, Fray Mateo de Mendoza.

The General Headquarters and Military Camp Base of the Philippine Commonwealth Army and Philippine Constabulary was stationed in Porac from 1942 to 1946 and the local military operates against the Imperial Japanese military and local collaborators from 1942 to 1945. The Mexican Expeditionary Air Force were given a base around Porac to help liberate the country from the Japanese Empire in World War II. (Marker: October 31, 2008, 412th Anniversary of Porac).

Geography
A portion of Mount Pinatubo is in the municipality.

Porac has a hilly to mountainous terrain in the majority of its plains. Most rivers, if not all, are heavily silted by mudflow due to the eruption of Mount Pinatubo and succeeding lahar flows. Tourist spots include Darabulbul Falls (nicknamed Dara Falls) in Jalung, Miyamit Falls in Sapang Uwak, and the hot springs of Sitio Puning, accessed through Sapang Bato in Angeles. Babo Pangulo offers a view of Porac and Mount Negron.

Barangays
Porac is politically subdivided into 29 barangays.

Climate

The town of Porac has two distinct climates, rainy and dry. The rainy or wet season normally begins in May and runs through October, while the rest of the year is the dry season. The warmest period of the year occurs between March and April, while the coolest period is from December through February.

Demographics

Economy 

Porac is an important source of granite and a tamping ground of minerals.

Porac is home to the Mekeni Food Corporation, an "AAA" Meat Processing Plant accredited with the National Meat Inspection Service (NMIS). Being classified under the "AAA" category, it is qualified to market its products, not just in the local, but in the international market as well. This means that it is compliant to all government regulatory requirements to assure food quality and safety in its operations (Sun Star, 2006).

In 2014, Ayala Land and Leonio Land embarked on developing a mixed-used estate in Porac known as Alviera. The development project combines business, residential, recreational, leisure, and institutional. The local government dubbed Alviera as the regional growth center of Central Luzon. Now, it is a premiere tourist destination in the north, and the Philippines' hub for karting with the presence of the Pampanga International Circuit.

Government

The municipal government is divided into three branches: executive, legislative and judiciary. The judicial branch is administered solely by the Supreme Court of the Philippines. The executive branch is composed of the mayor and the barangay captains for the barangays. The legislative branch is composed of the Sangguniang Bayan (town assembly), Sangguniang Barangay (barangay council), and the Sangguniang Kabataan for the youth sector.

Spanish-era Roman Catholic churches

Since the founding of the town of Porac in 1867, various Roman Catholic structures have been built in the area to aid in the religious practices of the devout Kapampangans. As of writing, three notable Spanish-era religious structures are extant within the municipality. The largest of the three, the Santa Catalina de Alejandria Church is located at Barangay Poblacion and still functions as one of Porac's main parochial structures. The other two are currently utilized as barangay chapels.

Santa Catalina de Alejandria Church
The Santa Catalina de Alejandria parish church is under the jurisdiction of the Roman Catholic Archdiocese of San Fernando. Its original structure, built in 1872, is largely intact but slight revisions have been made to the inside. It underwent restoration in the 1980s.

In the earthquake of 2019, the church belfry has been destroyed a day after Easter Sunday. Rebuilding operations are planned with call for donations to restore the church bell tower.

Pio Chapel
The 1861 Pio Chapel is a circular chapel built by Don Felino Gil, founder of the Escuela de Artes y Oficios (now the Don Honorio Ventura Technical State University).

Hacienda Dolores Chapel
Another vintage chapel is located at Barangay Dolores, north of the Porac town proper. The Our Lady of Sorrows Chapel was said to be built by the Dolores family within the old Hacienda Dolores in 1856. The chapel, like the Pio chapel, is currently utilized as a community chapel. The chapel boasts of a slender octagonal belfry and Doric columns adorning the two-level façade. Notable features of the chapel are finials found on both levels of the façade.

Archaeology

The area in and around Babo Balukbuk in Porac has strong indications of human habitation, according to investigations published on the University of the Philippines Archaeological Studies Program website. Later test excavations confirmed this conclusion through the presence of materials dated around 12th century to 17th century C.E.

Notable personalities
 Lito Lapid – Actor and Politician (Senator, 2019–present, 2004 – 2016 and Governor, 1995 – 2004)

Gallery

References

External links

 Porac Profile at PhilAtlas.com
 [ Philippine Standard Geographic Code]
Philippine Census Information
Local Governance Performance Management System
 

Municipalities of Pampanga
Spa towns in the Philippines